Gort na Móna is a Gaelic Athletic Association club in County Antrim, Northern Ireland. A member of Antrim GAA, it competes in Gaelic football, hurling, camogie and handball. The Irish-language name means "turf field". The club currently competes at Division 1 level in Senior Football and division 2 in hurling.

History
Gort na Móna GAC was established in 1974 at the initiative of Brother Moroney of the Irish Christian Brothers based in the Turf Lodge area of West Belfast. The club was selected as Antrim GAA Club of the Year in 2001, and in the same year, was awarded the Sports Council Junior Clubmark. The club celebrated its 40th anniversary in 2014.

Hurling
Gort na Móna won the Ulster Intermediate Club Hurling Championship for 2006 when on 5 November at St Tiernach's Park, Clones, they defeated the Down club title-holders, Liatroim, on a scoreline of 4-7 to 2-8. They met Liatroim again in the 2008 final and won again, by 3-16 to 0-5.

Honours
Ulster Intermediate Club Hurling Championship (2)
2006, 2008
Antrim Intermediate Hurling Championship (4)
1989, 1996, 2006, 2008
Antrim Junior Hurling Championship (4)
1984, 1990, 2017, 2019
Antrim All-County Hurling League Division 2 (1)
1999
Antrim All-County Hurling League Division 3 (1)
2019

Football
In Gaelic football the club's senior team secured promotion in 2007 for the first time to the top tier of Antrim football.

Honours
Antrim Intermediate Football Championship (1)
2005 
Antrim Junior Football Championship (1)
1989 
Antrim Under 21 Football Championship (1)
2007
Antrim Minor Football Championship (1)
2004 
Antrim All-County Football League Division 2 (3)
1996, 2006, 2018
Reserve Football Shield (1)
2016
Antrim All-County Reserve Football League Division 2 (1)
2016
Beringer Cup (3)
1996, 2000, 2018
Martin Cup (4)
1984, 2004, 2015, 2018

Handball

Honours
All-Ireland Club Handball Championship (2)
1999, 2000

Camogie

Honours
Antrim Junior Championship Shield (1)
2007
 Antrim All-County Camogie League Division 3 (1)
2015

External links
Gort na Mona CLG
Antrim GAA site
Antrim on Hoganstand.com
National and provincial titles won by Antrim teams
Club championship winners

See
 Gort Na Móna Secondary School

Gaelic games clubs in County Antrim